Maruf or Maroof is a town and union council of Okara District in the Punjab province of Pakistan.
It is located at 30°34'0N 73°52'0E with an altitude of 170 metres (561 feet)

References

Union councils of Okara District